Dance Band on the Titanic is the seventh studio album by the American singer-songwriter Harry Chapin, released in 1977. Its vinyl release is a double album. It was later released as a single CD.

Reception
Reviewed at the time of release, Sounds wrote: "Mr Chapin is such a master at his particular craft that his music itself is totally middle class, boring and as bland as the outward appearances and the public lifestyles of the men and women in his songs. So what is Chapin trying to do? Express suburban, boredom and frustration in realistic photographic detail? He does that alright."
The album sold poorly, but was voted Album of the Year by The Times of London

Track listing

Personnel 

Harry Chapin – guitar, vocals
Buzz Brauner – tenor saxophone
Barbara Carr – vocals
Stephen Chapin – piano, vocals
Tom Chapin – guitar, banjo, vocals
Harry DiVito – trombone
Howie Fields – drums
Steve Gadd – drums
Marsh Lynn Goldberg – vocals
Jeff Gross – vocals
Neil Jason – bass
Arthur Jenkins – percussion
Bernie Keising – bass, vocals
Art Krahulek – vocals
Barbara Lindquist – vocals
Theodore Marnel – vocals
Craig Mitchell – vocals
Nancy Newman – vocals
Ronald Palmer – guitar, vocals
John Quayle – vocals
Elliott Randall – guitar
Steve Randall – vocals
Donna D. Reilly – vocals
Kim Scholes – cello
Tim Scott – cello
Gus Skinas – programming
Mike Solomon – vocals
Chris Waite – percussion
Doug Walker – guitar, mandolin, vocals
John Wallace – bass, vocals

Charts

References

External links 
 

Harry Chapin albums
1977 albums
Elektra Records albums
RMS Titanic in fiction